Phoma nebulosa is a fungal plant pathogen infecting spinach.

References

External links 
 Index Fungorum
 USDA ARS Fungal Database

Fungal plant pathogens and diseases
Vegetable diseases
nebulosa
Fungi described in 1800